Kim Son-hyang (born 9 April 1997) is a North Korean freestyle wrestler. In 2017, she won one of the bronze medals in the 48 kg event at the 2017 World Wrestling Championships held in Paris, France.

In 2014, at the 2014 Summer Youth Olympics held in Nanjing, China, she won the gold medal in the girls' 46 kg event.

Major results

References

External links 
 

Living people
1997 births
Place of birth missing (living people)
North Korean female sport wrestlers
World Wrestling Championships medalists
Asian Games medalists in wrestling
Wrestlers at the 2018 Asian Games
Medalists at the 2018 Asian Games
Asian Games bronze medalists for North Korea
Wrestlers at the 2014 Summer Youth Olympics
Youth Olympic gold medalists for North Korea
20th-century North Korean women
21st-century North Korean women